Emery Go-Round is a fare-free public bus system in Emeryville, California. It also provides service to small portions of the adjacent cities of Oakland and Berkeley. Service is funded primarily by commercial property owners through a citywide transportation business improvement district.

Routes
Emery Go-Round operates four fixed routes. Service operates daily with 15 minute frequency, except selected holidays, with reduced service levels on weekends and selected additional holidays. All routes begin and end at MacArthur BART Station in Oakland.

External links
Official website

References

Bus transportation in California
Public transportation in Alameda County, California
Zero-fare transport services
Emeryville, California